Bobbili (Lok Sabha constituency) was one of the 25 Lok Sabha constituencies of Andhra Pradesh in India. It was one of the Lok Sabha constituency in Vizianagaram district of Andhra Pradesh till 2008.

Members of Parliament

Election results

General Election 2004

See also
Bobbili
List of Constituencies of the Lok Sabha

References

Vizianagaram district
Former Lok Sabha constituencies of Andhra Pradesh
Former constituencies of the Lok Sabha
2008 disestablishments in India
Constituencies disestablished in 2008